This was a new event to the ITF Women's Circuit in 2011. 
Sophie Ferguson and Sally Peers defeated Claudia Giovine and María Irigoyen in the final 6–4, 6–1.

Seeds

Draw

Draw

References
 Main Draw

Camparini Gioielli Cup - Trofeo Pompea - Doubles